Ernst Degner (born Ernst Eugen Wotzlawek on 22 September 1931 in Gleiwitz, Upper Silesia, Germany - died 10 September 1983 in Arona, Tenerife, Spain) was a professional Grand Prix motorcycle road racer from Eastern Germany. Degner was noted for defecting to the west in 1961, taking MZ's tuning techniques to Suzuki, and winning Suzuki's first Grand Prix championship in 1962.

Early life and early career
Degner's father died just before the end of World War II. Degner, his older sister and their mother fled from their home in Gleiwitz (now Gliwice, Poland) to avoid the advancing Red Army and wound up in Luckau, German Democratic Republic (East Germany) at the end of the war. Degner's mother died shortly thereafter. Degner attended Potsdam Technical High School and was awarded a diploma in development engineering in 1950. He became an apprentice motorcycle mechanic in Potsdam.

In 1950, Degner joined the Potsdam Motorcycle Club, where he met Daniel Zimmermann who had built an exceptionally fast 125cc racing motorcycle based on the DKW RT 125. It was called the ZPH, in recognition of its designer and engineer (Daniel Zimmermann) and its riders at that time (Bernhard Petruschke and Diethart Henkel). The ZPH proved faster than the East German factory IFAs (later renamed MZ), whose machines were also based on the DKW RT 125. Degner started racing in 1952 and after a successful season, he obtained his licence to ride in the "Ausweisklasse" in 1953. The 1953 season saw Degner record his first victories at the Leipziger Stadtpark and Bernau meetings. He ended the season as runner-up in the 125cc Ausweisklasse. Zimmermann provided him with a ZPH engine which Degner used to finish second (after Horst Fugner) in the 1955 East German 125cc Championship.

Racing with MZ
His racing successes on the ZPH were noted by the MZ team manager Walter Kaaden, who signed Degner as an engineer/rider for the Zschopau factory, but only after Degner had secured employment for his girlfriend Gerda Bastian at the factory. Degner started his employment with MZ on 1 March 1956, and raced successfully for the East German manufacturer, which used two-stroke engines. Kaaden had discovered principles regarding how sound waves and expansion chambers affect engine tuning for the engines. In 1957, Degner won 11 out of 14 125cc races which he competed in for the factory, and finished the season as the 1957 East German 125cc road racing national champion. From 1958 on, the factory entered Degner in all world Championship races and he scored his first world championship victory at the 1959 125cc Nations Grand Prix at Monza. He ended the season ranked fifth in the 125cc world championship and fourth in the 250cc world championship. A fall that he took while practicing at the Isle of Man TT races, the opening round of the 1960 World Championship series, hindered his quest for the 125cc World Title, but his second Grand Prix victory at the Belgian Grand Prix meant that he finished third in the 125cc world championship.

Defection
The Degner family's visits to attend races in the west forged friendships with Western riders and soon the Degners saw for themselves the much improved lifestyles of their friends compared to their own. Furthermore, the Degners had no wish to bring up their children in a totalitarian state obsessed with knowing everything that its citizens were thinking and doing. These thoughts encouraged the Degner family to consider the escaping to the west, as many East German professionals were already doing.

The initial plan was to cross from East Berlin into West Berlin and then fly to West Germany. The borders in Berlin allowed the free passage of East Germans into West Berlin where many then worked. Before such an escape could be implemented, the Berlin Wall was built in August 1961 and Berlin borders were tightly sealed. Degner then arranged for the escape of his family from the GDR in a car trunk on the weekend of 16-17 September 1961 while he was racing in the Swedish Grand Prix at Kristianstad. During the race, he could have secured the 125cc World Championship for himself and for MZ, but his engine failed early in the race. Ironically, his main rival for the 125cc World Title, Honda rider Tom Phillis, was unable to clinch the 125cc title at the race, as he finished sixth in the Swedish race, two laps behind the race winner. After the race, Degner drove his Wartburg car to Gedser, Denmark where he caught the ferry to Holstein-Grossenbrode, West Germany. From there, he drove to Dillingen on the France/German border and met up with his wife and family, who had already safely defected to West Germany.

After the MZ team had discovered his defection, the East German State accused Degner of deliberately destroying his engine in the Swedish race and the Allgemeiner Deutscher Motorsport Verband (ADMV, "General German Motorsport Federation") lodged a complaint with the FIM. The East Germans' accusations resulted in Degner's East German racing licence being revoked. Degner had, however, acquired a West German racing licence and with the help of Dr Joe Ehrlich, who owned EMC motorcycles, he was entered to ride a 125cc EMC at the next race of the championship in Argentina, where he could potentially salvage his world title. The ADMV advised the race organisers that Degner held no licence to race and the race organisers (who were paying the airfreight costs of getting motorcycles to Argentina) cabled the carriers of the EMC. This caused Degner's EMC machine being delayed on its journey to Argentina to the point where Degner was prevented from racing this EMC 125cc racer in the final 125cc World Championship round in Argentina. Phillis won the race and the World Title. Had Degner won that race, he could still have been crowned 125cc World Champion. At an FIM court in Geneva, Switzerland, on 25 and 26 November 1961, the court dismissed the complaint by MZ that Degner had deliberately wrecked the engine of his MZ at the 1961 Swedish Grand Prix.

Racing with Suzuki
In November 1961, Japanese company Suzuki hired him and he moved to Hamamatsu, Japan to work in the Suzuki race shop over the winter. Using the specialized two-stroke scavenger loop knowledge he had gained at MZ, Degner designed Suzuki's new 50cc and 125cc racers. By 14 October 1962, Degner had won Suzuki's first World Championship in the 50 cc class.

On 3 November 1962 at Suzuka's inaugural race meeting, Degner crashed when a gust of wind lifted the front wheel of his Suzuki 50cc racer as he rounded Turn 8. To mark Suzuka's first-ever crash, Turn 8, where Degner had crashed, was named Degner Curve.

The crash was witnessed and later reported by Suzuki Japan's racing Hiroyuki Nakano as follows:

In November (1962), the All Japan Championship Race was held at the completed Suzuka Circuit, where Degner raced alone in the lead of the 50cc race and showed great pace, but he fell and retired. The curve he fell at was named the 'Degner curve'.

At the Japanese Grand Prix of 10 November 1963, after a bad start, Degner crashed his Suzuki 250cc racer on his first lap at the exit to Turn 2 of the Suzuka Circuit. His Suzuki fuel tank was full and burst into flames, enveloping the rider. In his autobiography, Degner's Suzuki teammate Hugh Anderson stated: 

As we came out of the first corner on the start of the second lap, we were confronted with frantically waved yellow flags and a great cloud of smoke and flames. Ernst had crashed heavily and was lying unconscious. Frank [Perris] had stopped and marshals, after dragging Ernst from the flames, were busy with their fire extinguishers trying to control the inferno fuelled by 25 litres of petrol. The race carried on.

Degner's horrific burns required over fifty skin grafts and he was unable to return to race in the Suzuki team until September 1964. Later that year, he won the 125cc Japanese Grand Prix. He won three more Grands Prix in 1965 before retiring from motorcycle racing at the end of the 1966 season.

Later years and death
After dabbling with single-seater car racing, he worked for a spell as Technical Manager at Suzuki's German importer in Munich. He then moved to Tenerife, where he ran a car hire business. It was there, in 1983, that he died under mysterious circumstances. Degner had become dependent on medications after his crash in Japan, and his death possibly occurred from an overdose. Rumors persisted for years that Degner committed suicide or was murdered by the East German Stasi to avenge his defection. None of these caused Degner's untimely passing at the age of 51; his death certificate indicates that he died of a heart attack.

Motorcycle Grand Prix results 
Sources:

(key) (Races in italics indicate fastest lap)

References

Further reading

1931 births
1983 deaths
German automotive engineers
German motorcycle racers
250cc World Championship riders
125cc World Championship riders
50cc World Championship riders
Sportspeople from Gliwice
People from the Province of Upper Silesia
Two-stroke engine technology
East German defectors
East German emigrants to West Germany
East German racing drivers